Francis Edgar "Frank" Knight (1905-1998) was a navigation instructor in the Royal Air Force during World War II, after his retirement he became an author of fiction and non-fiction.

Biography
Knight was born in 1905. At the age of 15, Knight became an apprentice in the Merchant Navy. For ten years he served in many countries, visiting scores of ports, and obtaining his Extra Master Mariner's certificate when he was 24. Throughout the war he taught navigation in the RAF to pupil navigators of Bomber Coastal Commands. He flew regularly with pupils both in Britain and South Africa.

After the war, he reverted to selling yachts before settling down to write about the sea, including works in fiction and non fiction. He died in 1998 after publishing more than 45 books, primarily sea stories and war battles.

Frank Knights books were used in schools around the world for education and were fun to read, and used as supplementary reading for learning history.

Personal
Frank Knight married in 1933 to Elizabeth Mather, whom he called Betty. They emigrated to South Africa in 1940 with their two children, and went on to have two more children. After World war 2, they came back to England on a troopship. In 1966, Knight appeared on Blue Peter; he was interviewed by Lance Percival talking about old children's Stories which he had used as inspiration for early cartoons.

Bibliography
Knight authored the following books:
The Albatross Comes Home
The Island of Radiant Pearls (The Up-side-down Island)
Beginner’s Guide to the Sea
Mudlarks and Mysteries
Four an Half Deck
Stories of Famous Sea Fights
The Bluenose Pirate
Clippers to China
Family on the Tide
The Adventure Book for Boys
Kit Baxter’s War. Illustrated by John Lawrence
Colins Boys Annual
Met de compagnie naar Bengalen Meppel, A.Roelofs Goor. Also published in Swedish as Resan till Bengalen (1955)
He sailed with Blackbeard
Stories of Famous Sea Adventures
The Partick Steamboat
The Sea Story: Being a Guide to Nautical Reading from Ancient Times to the close of the Sailing Ship Era
Daily Mail Boys Annual
Onrust aan de waddenkust Utrecht, Het Spectrum 1959
The Sea Chest. Illustrated by William Riley. published by Collins & sons
The Sea’s Fool
The Last of the Lallows. Illustrated by William Stobbs. Published by Macmillan.&.co
The Ship That Came Home
Stories of Famous Explorers by Land. Illustrated by Will Nickless. published by The Westminster Press
The Golden Monkey. Illustrated by Lothar Walter. published by Macmillan & co
The Young Captain Cook
The Young Drake
The Young Columbus
The Sea Chest: Stories of Adventure at Sea
Up, Sea Beggars!
Remember Vera Cruz! illustrated by John Lawrence. Published by MacDonld.
Captain Cook & the Voyage of the Endeavour (1768–1771)
Rebel Admiral
Russia Fights Japan
Ships Now and Then
Stories of Famous Explorers by Sea
That Rare Captain: Sir Francis Drake
General-at-Sea. The life of Admiral Robert Blake
The Clipper Ship, Collins 1973
The Golden Age of the Galleon. published by William Collins Sons & Co Ltd, 1976
Stories of Famous Ships
Voyage to Bengal published by Macmillan & Co. London
Captain Anson and the Treasure of Spain
Olaf’s sword
True stories of the sea, Benn Editions, 1973, with illustrations by Victor Ambrus

References 

British writers
1905 births
1998 deaths